Elizabeth Jane Coatsworth (May 31, 1893 – August 31, 1986)  was an American writer of fiction and poetry for children and adults. She won the 1931 Newbery Medal from the American Library Association award recognizing The Cat Who Went to Heaven as the previous year's "most distinguished contribution to American literature for children." In 1968 she was a highly commended runner-up for the biennial international Hans Christian Andersen Award for children's writers.

Life
Elizabeth Coatsworth was born May 31, 1893, to Ida Reid and William T. Coatsworth, a prosperous grain merchant in Buffalo, New York. She attended Buffalo Seminary, a private girls' school, and spent summers with her family on the Canadian shore of Lake Erie. She began traveling as a child, visiting the Alps and Egypt at age five. Coatsworth graduated from Vassar College in 1915 as Salutatorian. In 1916 she received a Master of Arts from Columbia University. She then traveled to eastern Asia, riding horseback through the Philippines, exploring Indonesia and China, and sleeping in a Buddhist monastery. These travels would later influence her writing.

In 1929, she married writer Henry Beston, with whom she had two daughters, Margaret and Catherine. They lived at Hingham, Massachusetts, and Chimney Farm in Nobleboro, Maine. Her daughter, Kate Barnes (1932–2013), would go on to become accomplished in writing in her own right, being named the first Poet Laureate of Maine.

Elizabeth Coatsworth died at her home in Nobleboro, August 31, 1986. Her papers are held in the Kerlan Collection at the University of Minnesota and Bowdoin College, Brunswick, Maine,<ref name=20thC>Chevalier, Tracy (editor), 'Twentieth-Century Children's Writers, St. James Press, 1989, pp. 218</ref> with a small archive from late in her career in the de Grummond Collection at the University of Southern Mississippi.  There is also a collection of her papers at the Maine Women Writers Collection held at the University of New England, Portland, Maine.

Career

Coatsworth began her career publishing her poetry in magazines. Her first book was a poetry collection for adults, Fox Footprints, in 1912. A conversation with her friend, Louise Seaman, who had just founded the first children's book publishing department in the United States at Macmillan, led Coatsworth to write her first children's book, The Cat and the Captain. In 1930 she published The Cat Who Went to Heaven. The story of an artist who is painting a picture of Buddha for a group of monks, it won the Newbery Medal for "the most distinguished contribution to American literature for children".Nineteenth-Century Children's Writers says "Coatsworth reached her apogee in her nature writing, notably The Incredible Tales". These four books were published for adults in the 1950s. They tell the story of the Perdrys, a family living in the forests of northern Maine who may not be entirely human.

Coatsworth had a long career, publishing over 90 books from 1910 to her autobiography and final book in 1976.

 Selected works 

For childrenThe Cat and the Captain, illustrated by Gertrude Kaye, Macmillan, 1927The Cat Who Went to Heaven, ill. Lynd Ward, Macmillan, 1930The Golden Horseshoe, ill. Robert Lawson, Macmillan, 1935Sword of the Wilderness, ill. Harve Stein, Macmillan, 1936Alice-All-by-Herself, ill. Marguerite de Angeli, Macmillan, 1937Dancing Tom, ill. Grace Paull, Macmillan, 1938You Shall have a Carriage, ill. Henry Clarence Pitz, Macmillan, 1941Runaway Home, ill. Gustaf Tenggren, Row, Peterson and Company, 1942Indian Mound Farm, ill. Fermin Rocker, Macmillan, 1943Up Hill and Down: Stories, ill. James Davis, Knopf, 1947Night and the Cat, ill. Foujita, Macmillan, 1950Dollars for Luck, ill. George and Doris Hauman, Macmillan, 1951; reissued 1972 as The Sailing Hatrack, Blackie (UK)Cat Stories, ill. Feodor Stepanovich Rojankovsky, Simon & Schuster, 1953Dog Stories, ill. Rojankovsky, Simon & Schuster, 1953Old Whirlwind: The Story of Davy Crockett, ill. Manning Lee, Macmillan, 1953Horse Stories, by Kate Barnes and Coatsworth, ill. Rojankovsky, Simon & Schuster, 1954The Peddler's Cart, ill. Zhenya Gay, Macmillan, 1956Pika and the Roses, ill. Kurt Wiese, Pantheon, 1959Lonely Maria, ill. Evaline Ness, Pantheon, 1960The Noble Doll, ill. Leo Politi, Viking, 1961Chimney Farm Bedtime Stories, by Henry Beston and Coatsworth, ill. Maurice Day, Holt, Reinhart and Winston, 1966The Lucky Ones: Five Journeys Toward a Home, ill. Janet Doyle, Macmillan, 1968Under the Green Willow, ill Janina Domanska, Macmillan, 1971The Wanderers, ill. Trina Schart Hyman, Scholastic, 1972Pure Magic, ill. Ingrid Fetz, Macmillan 1973; reissued 1975 as The Werefox, Collier (US), and The Fox Boy, Blackie (UK)Marra's World, ill. Krystyna Turska, Greenwillow, 1975

Sally series
The five historical novels featuring "Sally" were all illustrated by Helen Sewell and published by Macmillan US.Away Goes Sally, 1934Five Bushel Farm, 1938The Fair American ,1940The White Horse , 1942The Wonderful Day, 1946

For adults

NovelsHere I Stay, Coward McCann, 1938The Trunk, Macmillan, 1941

The Incredible TalesThe Enchanted, Pantheon, 1951Silky: An Incredible Tale, Pantheon, 1953Mountain Bride: An Incredible Tale, Pantheon 1954The White Room, Pantheon, 1958

PoetryFox Footprints, Knopf, 1923, poetryCountry Poems, Macmillan, 1942The Creaking Stair, Coward McCann, 1949

OtherThe Sun's Diary: A Book of Days for Any Year, Macmillan, 1929Country Neighborhood, Macmillan, 1945Maine Ways, Macmillan, 1947Especially Maine: The Natural World of Henry Beston from Cape Cod to the St. Lawrence; (editor), Stephen Greene, 1970Personal Geography: Almost an Autobiography'', Stephen Greene, 1976

See also

References

External links
 
 

 
 
 

American children's writers
American nature writers
American women poets
American women novelists
Newbery Medal winners
1893 births
1986 deaths
Buffalo Seminary alumni
Vassar College alumni
People from Nobleboro, Maine
Writers from Buffalo, New York
20th-century American novelists
20th-century American poets
American women children's writers
Women science writers
20th-century American women writers
Novelists from New York (state)
American women non-fiction writers
20th-century American non-fiction writers